Nele Gilis, (born 20 February 1996 in Belgium) is a professional squash player who represents Belgium. She reached a career-high world ranking of World No. 9 in 2022.

Career overview
As a junior, Gilis had significant success and became well-established internationally. She was the European Junior Squash Championships champion in 2014 and a semifinalist at the British Junior Open Squash 2015.

Gilis clinched her first PSA World Tour title in 2016 at the Open International Des Volcans with a 3-1 win over Amanda Landers-Murphy leading her to break into the world’s top 40. The next year Nele picked up her second title in the final of the Irish Open in five games against England’s Millie Tomlinson. Later in 2017 at the start of the season in September, she achieved the biggest result of her professional career at the PSA W25 Open International de Squash de Nantes after reaching the final but coming up short against Englishwoman Fiona Moverley.

Personal life
Nele's younger sister, Tinne Gilis is also a professional squash player and her fellow competitor on the PSA World Tour. Her younger brother Jo Gilis is a professional footballer in Belgium who has represented the Belgian national under-16 and under-17 football teams.

Nele is currently in a relationship with professional squash player Paul Coll of New Zealand.

References

External links 

Belgian female squash players
Living people
1996 births
Competitors at the 2017 World Games
People from Mol, Belgium
Sportspeople from Antwerp Province